Zynga Poker is a social game developed by Zynga as an application for the social-networking website Facebook as well as Android, iPhone, Windows Phone, Windows, MySpace, Tagged, and Google+. It was launched in July 2007.

In 2011, with 38 million players, Zynga Poker was the largest poker site in the world. In 2018, after increased competition in the market, Zynga Poker had a 6.1% market share in social casino games.

Gameplay
The game allows Facebook players to simulate playing Texas Hold 'em poker in a social gaming environment. Users enter a casino lobby and can play at any table or join friends for a game. Players can choose from casual tables, tournament play, or VIP tables. A leader board shows players how they compare in chip ranking to other players and allows players to send or receive gifts.

History

Development and market dominance
It was created and launched in July 2007 by a team consisting of some of the founders of the company including Justin Waldron, Michael Luxton, and Eric Schiermeyer. 

In March 2011, Zynga Poker hosted PokerCon, a live poker tournament at the Palms Casino in Las Vegas, Nevada. According to a March 2011 ESPN article, with 38 million players, Zynga Poker at that time was the largest poker site in the world.

In July 2012, Zynga announced that it would be providing real-money gaming outside of United States in 2013.

According to a 2014 article by Dean Takahashi, about 350 million have played Zynga Poker, and the game has millions of daily players.

Update and loss of market dominance
In July 2014, the game received a major update. According to Jeff Grubb of VentureBeat, the change was unpopular with users, who believed that Zynga was "throwing too many unwanted features in the way" of playing poker.

In 2014, Zynga Poker "commanded 61 percent of the total social poker revenue market," and each month earned between $9 and $13 million. That year, its audiences dropped 44%. After the revamp in 2014, players "forced the publisher" to bring back a "classic" version of the original poker game. Also, Zynga Poker's CEO and games head left around that time. VentureBeat said in 2015 that Zynga Poker's players were increasingly moving to social casino games, with the overall social poker game industry struggling largely "due to the struggles of Zynga's Poker app, which dominates the marketplace."

In 2014, Zynga Poker was Zynga's flagship game and its top-grossing game.

Recent features and events
In the first quarter of 2017, the company reported a loss, although revenue was rising compared to the year prior. In 2018, Zynga Poker accounted for 23% of Zynga's game revenue. After added competition in the market, in 2018 analysts said that Zynga lost its market share in social casino games, with only a 6.1% market share. Zynga Poker introduced a new "Spin and Win" mode in its World Poker Tour Tournament Center in 2019, essentially combining poker with a prize wheel. In November 2018, Zynga Poker reported its mobile revenue falling 3% that year, with bookings remaining flat, with Zynga stating the game was "still recovering from the platform changes imposed by Facebook in [the second financial quarter]." At the time, Zynga was partnering with World Poker Tour.

In quarter one of 2019, Zynga Poker was 15% of Zynga's total revenue, after being 21% of that revenue in the first quarter of 2018. In 2019, the company hired Brad Garrett on a sweepstakes event. In March 2019 Zynga Poker added a tournament code called Spin & Win, allowing for faster play and higher stakes. According to Consumer Affairs, in 2019, Zynga Poker users suffered a data breach.

Although Zynga made a slight profit in 2019, Zynga Poker's profit dropped by 7%, "as it is still recovering from platform changes that Facebook made last year. Gibeau said the company is working on updates that will help Zynga Poker get back into growth mode."

Zynga Poker uses Chips as an in-game currency. People need to buy the chips to play the game. This feature as help to increase revenue of Zynga Poker game. Game also offers Zynga Poker Free Chips to interact with more players.

Languages and availability
As of August 2010, the game is available in Mandarin Chinese in China as well as on Facebook in Hong Kong and Taiwan under the name Zynga Texas Poker. The game is also available in English, Indonesian, Spanish, Portuguese, Turkish, and French. The mobile version of the game is available in 18 languages.

Sponsorships
In 2018, Nascar announced that Go Fas Racing was partnering with Zynga Poker, with the game serving as primary sponsor for the No. 32 Ford and Matt DiBenedetto.

References

External links 
Official website

2007 video games
IOS games
Android (operating system) games
Facebook games
Multiplayer online games
Poker video games
Video games developed in the United States
Windows games
Windows Phone games
Zynga